Jessica Bennett is a fictional character from the American soap opera Passions created by head writer James E. Reilly. Jessica's character was played by three different actresses during the show's run: Mary Elizabeth Winstead (July 5, 1999, to March 28, 2000), Jade Harlow (June 5, 2000, to July 8, 2003), and Danica Stewart (July 10, 2003, to July 17, 2008). She was also played by model Michelle Holgate for two episodes in 2002 when Harlow was unavailable.

Jessica is a member of the Bennett family.

Storylines

Mary Elizabeth Winstead (1999–2000)
Jessica was a quiet, seemingly perfect daughter. She was very close to her mother, working part-time in her mother's craft shop, even though she was only fourteen when the show started. While she loved her sister Kay, the two had an adversarial relationship, mostly because she knew that Kay was always scheming. When push came to shove, though, she was there for Kay, refusing to tell their parents that Kay knew Faith was Grace's sister for weeks before the rest of them found out the truth, and that Kay's schemes to get Miguel are the real reason that Faith and Grace never met. In part because she sees their love for each other, and in part to foil her scheming sibling, Jessica has always been a strong supporter of Charity and Miguel's relationship.

Jade Harlow (2000–2003)
Jessica's first major act on her own was to switch the voting box at the prom, which Kay had rigged to make sure Miguel was crowned king and she was crowned queen. She was in the background for a long period of time, but became more involved in Kay's plans to get to Miguel, motivated by her own secret crush on Miguel. Unfortunately for Jessica, Reese can only see one woman. Her older sister Kay. As the youngest character on the show, Jessica is the only one still in high-school. Jessica's faith in her family was shaken by the recent appearance of David and John, but she is determined to support her mother, and help her new brother John acclimate to life with siblings. Although she suspects David is up to no good, she has no idea that John isn't her brother.

During this time, Jessica is stuck in the middle of the war between her sister, Kay, their parents, Miguel, and Charity. Jessica was the one who found Kay in Miguel's bed, and for just one moment, saw Charity in the bed instead of Kay. She knows that Miguel believed that it was Charity he was with, and has seen enough of her sister's hatred and evil over the years to know that Kay forced herself on Miguel. But she doesn't have much of a foothold right now, as everyone recently learned that Jessica was secretly involved with Kay's "boyfriend" Reese for the past few months. When Kay used magic on some popcorn in the hopes of breaking up Charity and Miguel, the plan backfired, and instead, it broke up Jessica and Reese. It wasn't long before Jessica realized her sister was behind her break-up.

Danica Stewart (2003–2008)
After graduating from high-school, Jessica got a job as a "mark" cosmetics girl to help pay her way through college. Although currently attending college, much of her time is spent worrying about her family. Since Grace chose David Hastings, Jessica turned her back on her mother, in part because she was vulnerable to her sister Kay's manipulations. Jessica seemed to be the good Bennett sister, never getting into trouble, but when Sam and Ivy's relationship started getting more serious, Jessica ended up on a downward spiral, and began acting out by cutting herself and smoking. She became a club girl, and it wasn't long before she was drugged and raped by an older man named Randy at a club.

Jessica soon met the older Spike, the owner of the sleaziest late-night dive in Harmony. Spike took advantage of Jessica's confusion and pain, and it wasn't long before he had his young lover addicted to drugs, and convinced her that she had to prostitute herself for him on the streets. He used guilt to convince her to do it, because her family was responsible for his club burning down. Every time she tried to fight him and leave him; Spike would manipulate her into coming back to him, and it wasn't long before Jessica started experiencing blackouts and waking up next to dead johns. Although Paloma and Simone helped her to cover her role in the murders, even Jessica herself doesn't know if she actually killed the men.

Jessica kept trying to get away with Spike, and it seemed like she finally did in Rome, where The couple eventually married during the summer of 2006, although the wedding was not shown on-air like other marriages on Passions. In November 2006, Jessica attended several meetings of AA for her drinking problem. Jessica had the idea that Miguel wanted her help to forget about Kay and tried to seduce him. Jessica's recovery was set back when she learned that Grace had died in an explosion in London while trying to get home to reunite with Sam.

Jessica didn't believe she had the strength to leave Spike, but she was given a vision of her future by Endora and that gave her the strength to move back into her father's house. The same day she moved in, she learned that she was pregnant with Spike's baby. Spike wanted her to sell the baby and she refused, running to Tabitha's house next door for safety.

Spike tried to kill Jessica by burying her in a crate. Jessica's family and friends searched everywhere for her, but they were too late; Jessica and her unborn baby's spirits left her body. However, Kay had everyone pray to God for Jessica's safe return before they unburied her, causing their spirits to return to Jessica's body. After unburying her, Eve was able to wake up Jessica. She was at home with policeman guarding her because Spike broke out of jail. Sam soon discovered Jessica's role in the murders and was about to arrest her, but thanks to the magical intervention by her novice witch sister Kay, Spike was revealed to be the murderer and arrested by Paloma Lopez-Fitzgerald.
Jessica returned to Harmony on January 7, 2008, after staying in a convent with her cousin Charity in order to give birth away from Spike and those that she felt were judging her. Either in late 2007 or early January 2008, Jessica gave birth to a son, whom she named Samuel Bennett after her father and grandfather; she eventually gave the boy the middle name of Herbert at the demand of Spike, whose legal first name is Herbert.

Kay has since mentioned that Jessica entered rehab to make sure she stayed clean and to keep herself and Samuel away from Spike.
Jessica returned on July 16, 2008, to wish Kay luck for her wedding to Miguel. She revealed that she had reconciled with Reese, and was continuing in rehab with her son Sam by her side. Jessica did not attend Kay and Miguel's wedding due to the temptations of alcohol. It is revealed in the series finale, Jessica has powers like her sister, cousin, and mother.

Supernatural incidents
Although a Standish woman, Jessica seemingly did not inherit the Standish powers, but Jessica believes in both her mother and cousin's visions and powers. Even though Jessica seemingly has no powers, she has an uncanny ability to see through evil. In the series finale of "Passions", it is revealed by Kay that Jessica also received the Standish powers and she is also a witch; however, she chooses not to use them.

Reception

See also
 Bennett and Standish families

External links

American female characters in television
Fictional prostitutes
Fictional witches
Passions characters
Television characters introduced in 1999